Free sex can refer to:  

 Promiscuity, undiscriminating casual sex with many sexual partners
 Group sex
 Human sexual activity that does not cost money (as opposed to sex that is paid for)

See also
 Free love